Route 106 or Highway 106 can refer to multiple roads:

Canada
  New Brunswick Route 106
  Nova Scotia Highway 106
  Prince Edward Island Route 106
  Saskatchewan Highway 106

China
  China National Highway 106

Costa Rica
 National Route 106

India
 National Highway 106 (India)

Italy
 State road 106

Japan
 National Route 106

Philippines
 N106 highway (Philippines)

United States
 U.S. Route 106 (former)
 Alabama State Route 106
 Arkansas Highway 106
 California State Route 106 (former)
 Connecticut Route 106
 County Road 106 (Duval County, Florida)
 County Road 106B (Duval County, Florida)
 Georgia State Route 106
 Illinois Route 106
 Indiana State Road 106
 K-106 (Kansas highway)
 Kentucky Route 106
 Louisiana Highway 106
 Maine State Route 106
 Maryland Route 106 (former)
 Massachusetts Route 106
 M-106 (Michigan highway)
 Minnesota State Highway 106
 Missouri Route 106
 Nebraska Highway 106 (former)
 New Hampshire Route 106
 County Route 106 (Bergen County, New Jersey)
 New Mexico State Road 106
 New York State Route 106
 County Route 106 (Albany County, New York)
 County Route 106 (Cortland County, New York)
 County Route 106A (Cortland County, New York)
 County Route 106 (Erie County, New York)
 County Route 106 (Nassau County, New York)
 County Route 106 (Orange County, New York)
 County Route 106 (Orleans County, New York)
 County Route 106 (Rockland County, New York)
 County Route 106 (Schenectady County, New York)
 County Route 106 (Suffolk County, New York)
 County Route 106 (Westchester County, New York)
 North Carolina Highway 106
 Ohio State Route 106 (former)
 Oklahoma State Highway 106
 Pennsylvania Route 106
 South Dakota Highway 106
 Tennessee State Route 106
 Texas State Highway 106 (former)
 Texas State Highway Loop 106
 Texas State Highway Spur 106 (former)
 Farm to Market Road 106
 Utah State Route 106
 Vermont Route 106
 Virginia State Route 106
 Virginia State Route 106 (1923-1928) (former)
 Virginia State Route 106 (1928-1933) (former)
 Virginia State Route 106 (1933-1940) (former)
 Washington State Route 106
 West Virginia Route 106
 Wisconsin Highway 106

Territories
 Puerto Rico Highway 106

See also
A106
B106 road
Pahang State Route C106
D106 road
N106 (Bangladesh)
P106
R106 road (Ireland)